The western fieldwren (Calamanthus montanellus) is a species of bird in the family Acanthizidae, endemic to southwestern Australia. It is often considered a subspecies (Calamanthus campestris montanellus) of the rufous fieldwren (C. campestris), most notably by Christidis and Boles in their 2008 work, but as a separate species by many other authorities including the IOC.

References

western fieldwren
Endemic birds of Southwest Australia
western fieldwren